Eduard Vojan (May 5, 1853 – May 31, 1920) was a famous Czech actor of early cinema.

External links
Online Profile in Czech

1853 births
1920 deaths
Male actors from Prague
People from the Kingdom of Bohemia
Czech male stage actors
Czech male silent film actors
20th-century Czech male actors
Recipients of the Order of Franz Joseph